Stasiuk is a Ukrainian-language surname. Originally it was a given name derived from the name Stanislaw, diminutive: Stach.  Notable people with the surname include:

Andrzej Stasiuk, Polish writer
Vic Stasiuk, Canadian retired professional ice hockey left winger and a former NHL head coach
Peter Stasiuk, Canadian-born Australian Ukrainian Greek Catholic hierarch
Iryna Charnushenka-Stasiuk, Belarusian long jumper 
Melissa Stasiuk, Ukrainian-born Argentinian model
Mykola Stasyuk, Ukrainian politician

Ukrainian-language surnames